American singer, songwriter, pianist and composer Amy Lee has released one studio album, one extended play, one soundtrack album, five singles, two promotional singles, eight music videos and composed four film scores. Lee is also the co-founder and lead vocalist of the rock band Evanescence.

Lee's solo career began as a featured vocalist on songs by David Hodges and Big Dismal. Lee provided guest vocals on Seether's 2004 single "Broken", which reached number twenty on Billboard Hot 100. She then collaborated with Korn in 2007 on an acoustic rendition of "Freak on a Leash", which reached number 89 on Billboard Hot 100. Lee has also appeared on three tribute albums: Nightmare Revisited (2008), Muppets: The Green Album (2011) and We Walk the Line: A Celebration of the Music of Johnny Cash (2012).

During Evanescence's hiatus in 2013, Lee embarked on her film score career by composing the soundtrack to War Story with Dave Eggar, which led to the release of the soundtrack album Aftermath (2014) and promotional single "Lockdown". Aftermath reached number 47 on Billboard 200. In 2015, Lee and Eggar teamed up again with Chuck Palmer on the score for Indigo Grey: The Passage, which won Best Film Score at the Moondance International Film Festival. Since October 2015, Lee has been releasing cover songs online, accompanied by music videos directed by Eric Ryan Anderson. In February 2016, she released her debut extended play, Recover, Vol. 1, which features the first four covers in the series. Lee is scheduled to release her debut album, Dream Too Much (2016), on September 30, 2016. She released her second solo single "Speak to Me" - the title song to the upcoming film Voice from the Stone - in 2017.

Albums

Studio albums

Soundtrack albums

Extended plays

Singles

As lead artist

As featured artist

Promotional singles

Other appearances

As lead artist

As featured artist

Music videos

As lead artist

Guest appearances

Film scores

References

External links 

Amy Lee
Discographies of American artists
Rock music discographies